is a joint-use railway station located in the city of Aomori in Aomori Prefecture, Japan. The station is served by passenger services on the Aoimori Railway Line and freight services are operated by the Japan Freight Railway Company.

Location

Station layout
The station has a single island platform. This is connected to an unattended station building by a footbridge.

Platforms

History
Higashi-Aomori Station opened on 21 July 1968, as a station on the Japanese National Railways (JNR), when the Tōhoku Main Line was re-routed to the south of the downtown areas of the city. With the privatization of JNR on 1 April 1987, it came under the operational control of East Japan Railway Company (JR East). The section of the Tōhoku Main Line including this station was transferred to Aoimori Railway on 4 December 2010.

A large shopping complex was opened next to the station in November 2003.

Services
For passengers, Higashi-Aomori Station is primarily served by trains operating on a local service on the Aoimori Railway Line between Aomori and Hachinohe. Passenger trains serve Higashi-Aomori Station just under 18 hours a day from 5:49am to 11:45pm. In 2018, a daily average of 1,338 passengers boarded trains at Higashi-Aomori Station, an increase from the daily average of 990 passengers the station served in 2011. In 2018, the station was the fourth busiest on the Aoimori Railway Line, excluding Aomori and Hachinohe stations, and the second busiest along the rail line in the city of Aomori.

See also
List of railway stations in Japan

References

External links

  

Railway stations in Aomori Prefecture
Aoimori Railway Line
Railway stations in Japan opened in 1968
Aomori (city)
Stations of Japan Freight Railway Company